"E Ipo" (English: "By Love") is a 1982 song written by Prince Tui Teka and Ngoi Pēwhairangi in tribute to Teka's wife Missy, sung bilingually in Māori and English. The song was a number-one single in New Zealand for two weeks.

The melody was based on the popular Indonesian love song "Mimpi Sedih" by Aloysius Riyanto that Teka had heard from New Zealand soldiers stationed in Singapore while he was performing overseas from 1980-1982.

The video for the song was taken from a TV special filmed at the Mandalay nightclub in Newmarket, Auckland. The song later made the Nature's Best 3 compilation, a collection of the top 100 New Zealand songs as voted by members of APRA.

"E Ipo", alongside "Poi E" (1984) by the Pātea Māori Club (also written by Pēwhairangi) were the first widely successful songs sung in Te Reo Māori in mainstream music, and had a great impact on the promotion of Te Reo and Māori culture in New Zealand.

References

External links
 Prince Tui Teka - Mum and E Ipo
 Lyrics for E Ipo

1982 singles
1982 songs
Macaronic songs
Number-one singles in New Zealand
Māori-language songs
Songs written by Ngoi Pēwhairangi
Song recordings produced by Dalvanius Prime